Jan Karol Dolski of Kościesza  (1637–1695) was a member of the nobility of the Polish–Lithuanian Commonwealth. Throughout his life he held a number of posts, including the post of Grand Marshal of Lithuania, Court Marshal of Lithuania and Cup-bearer. He was also the starost of Pinsk and was responsible for extending that town considerably.

During the Deluge, that is the Swedish invasion of Poland, he fielded a Chorągiew of cavalry and commanded it personally in the battle of Warsaw (1656). He also led a regiment in the Russo-Polish War (1654–67) and then took part in quelling the Lubomirski's Rebellion.

In 1667 and 1668 he was a deputy to the Polish General sejm. A supporter of Michał Korybut Wiśniowiecki, he supported his election as the new king of Poland in 1669. The following year he received the honorary title of the Grand Carver of Lithuania.

He took part in the battle of Chocim (1673). In 1674 he supported Jan III Sobieski in the next elections for the king of Poland. For his merits in 1676 the Sejm granted him with a prize of 20 thousand złoty. A senior member of the Sejm, in 1678 and 1679 he preceded the king's council. In 1685 he became the Court Marshal of Lithuania, and in 1691 the grand marshal.

Polish people of the Russo-Polish War (1654–1667)
17th-century Polish nobility
1637 births
1695 deaths
Secular senators of the Polish–Lithuanian Commonwealth
Members of the Sejm of the Polish–Lithuanian Commonwealth
Grand Marshals of the Grand Duchy of Lithuania
Court Marshals of the Grand Duchy of Lithuania